Great News is an American sitcom television series created and written by Tracey Wigfield, and executive produced by Wigfield alongside Tina Fey, Robert Carlock, and David Miner for 3 Arts Entertainment, Little Stranger and Universal Television. The series premiered April 25, 2017 on NBC.

On May 11, 2017, NBC renewed Great News for a second season of 13 episodes, which premiered on September 28, 2017. On May 11, 2018, NBC canceled the series after two seasons.

Premise
The series, set in the world of television news, follows an up-and-coming news producer who finds herself dealing with a new intern: her mother.

Cast and characters

Main
Briga Heelan as Katherine "Katie" Wendelson, a segment producer at The Breakdown who suddenly has to deal with the presence of her mother Carol, who is hired as an intern at the show 
Andrea Martin as Carol Wendelson, Katie's mother and an intern at The Breakdown 
Adam Campbell as Greg Walsh, an executive producer at The Breakdown and Katie's boss and love interest 
Nicole Richie as Portia Scott-Griffith, co-anchor of The Breakdown
Horatio Sanz as Justin, video editor at The Breakdown
John Michael Higgins as Chuck Pierce, co-anchor of The Breakdown who was once a well-respected network anchor

Recurring
 Tracey Wigfield as Beth Vierk: the meteorologist for The Breakdown
 Sheaun McKinney as Wayne: a cameraman for The Breakdown
 Brad Morris as Gene: one of the segment producers on The Breakdown
 Stewart Skelton as Dave Wendelson: Katie's father and Carol's husband, whose face is always partially obscured
 Vicki Lawrence as Angie Deltaliano: Carol's best friend
 Sarah Baker as Joyce Vickley: a human resources employee who comes in contact with The Breakdown staff
 Adam Countee as Chip: co-host of The Chip & Chet Report, a competitor of The Breakdown
 Dave Hill as Chet: co-host of The Chip & Chet Report, a competitor of The Breakdown
 Ana Gasteyer as Kelly: boozy co-host of Morning Wined Up, MMN's morning show
 Rachel Dratch as Mary-Kelly: boozy co-host of Morning Wined Up, MMN's morning show
 Christina Pickles as Mildred Marlock (season 1): the owner of MMN and Greg's grandmother
 Tina Fey as Diana St. Tropez (season 2): the new head of MMN
 Reid Scott as Jeremy (season 2): Katie's new boyfriend and a workaholic reporter for The New York Times
 Jim Rash as Fenton Pelt (season 2): the billionaire owner of Pelt Industries who sues MMN due to a story reported by The Breakdown

Guest

 Tommy Dewey as Trip ("War Is Hell")
 Robin Leach as himself and 'Pond Scum' co-host ("Carol Has a Bully")
 Chris Parnell as Gerald, Diana St. Tropez's assistant ("Squad Feud")
 Rev. Run as himself ("Honeypot!")
 Christopher McDonald as Len Archer ("Award Show")
 Cecily Strong as Jessica Mancuso ("Night of the Living Screen")
 Rashad Jennings as Carvell ("Pool Show")
 Will Sasso as Petey Pierce, Chuck's mid 30s son ("A Christmas Carol Wendelson")
 Judith Roberts as Grammy ("Love is Dead")
 Jayma Mays as Cat ("Catfight")
 Tim Meadows as Lawyer ("The Fast Track")
 Ray Liotta as himself ("Early Retirement")
 Nat Faxon as Anthony Lyon ("Early Retirement")

Episodes

Season 1 (2017)

Season 2 (2017–18)

Reception
Great News has received generally positive reviews from critics. On Rotten Tomatoes the series has an approval rating of 76% based on 33 reviews, with an average rating of 6.15/10. The site's critical consensus reads, "Great News overcomes its familiar trappings with gently subversive humor and a smart cast of talented, likable actors." On Metacritic, the series has a score of 67 out of 100, based on 21 critics, indicating "generally favorable reviews".

References

See also

Room for Two, a sitcom that ran for two seasons, starting in 1992, about a young female TV producer (Patricia Heaton) whose mother (Linda Lavin) ends up working on the same show, and getting involved in her daughter's professional and personal life.

External links
 
 

2010s American single-camera sitcoms
2010s American workplace comedy television series
2017 American television series debuts
2018 American television series endings
English-language television shows
NBC original programming
Television news sitcoms
Television series about television

Television series by 3 Arts Entertainment
Television series by Universal Television
Television shows set in New York City